The key macroeconomic data in the eurozone countries are:
General government net debt / Percent of GDP;
General government net lending/borrowing / Percent of GDP;
inflation rate;
gross domestic product (real GDP);
unemployment.

Chronology

Year 1998

Year 1999

Year 2000

Year 2001

Year 2002

Year 2003

Year 2004

Year 2005

Year 2006

Year 2007

Year 2008

Year 2009

Year 2010

Year 2011

External links
International Monetary Fund, Home page – Countries
 International Monetary Fund, Home page – UME
International Monetary Fund – Debt/% of GDP
International Monetary Fund – Deficit/% of GDP
International Monetary Fund – Inflation)
International Monetary Fund – Real GDP
International Monetary Fund – Unemployment

Eurozone
Currency unions